Rodric Anthony Pacheco (born May 7, 1958), more commonly known as Rod Pacheco, is an American politician. He served in the Riverside County District Attorney's Office as a Deputy District Attorney, Chief Deputy District Attorney, Assistant District Attorney and then as District Attorney from 2007 to 2011 in Riverside County, California.

He served in the California State Assembly from 1996 to 2002, serving as Republican leader from 1998 to 1999. Pacheco was defeated on June 8, 2010, in his bid for a second term as Riverside County District Attorney. In January 2011, SNR Denton, a global law firm, announced Pacheco would join the firm and serve in its Los Angeles office. Pacheco became a Partner in Litigation, White Collar, and Public Policy Public Strategies Practice Groups at SNR Denton in January 2011. Pacheco left SNR Denton in October 2014 to join Theodora Oringher PC. Pacheco was recruited by Theodora Oringher PC to form and lead the White Collar/Internal Investigations Practice Group for the firm.

Education
In 1976 Pacheco graduated from Aquinas High School in San Bernardino, California. He received his Bachelor of Arts in Political Science and Sociology from the University of California, Riverside in 1980. He received his Juris Doctor degree from the University of San Diego School of Law in 1983.

Career

Prosecution career 
Pacheco began working for the Riverside County District Attorney's Office in 1984. In his last 10 years as district attorney prior to being elected to the Assembly, Pacheco won every single case that he tried which included 5 death penalty cases. His skill as a prosecutor was acknowledged his first year in the office when he was named "Prosecutor of the Year" in the Juvenile Crime Division. In 1987 Pacheo received the "Outstanding Achievement Award" and in 1994 he received the "Special Achievement Award" for his work in the District Attorney's Criminal Division.

Assembly career 
Pacheco ran for the California State Assembly in 1996. With his victory, he became the first Latino Republican elected in more than a century. He was elected Leader of the Republican caucus, marking the first time in the state's history that a Latino has served in that capacity.

Pacheco sought greater protections for the men and women of law enforcement. During his first term in office, he authored the successful Proposition 222 – "The Peace Officer's Safety Initiative" – which prohibited the possibility of parole for the murder of a peace officer. Proposition 222 garnered nearly 80% of California voters' support on the June 1998 ballot.

In honor of Pacheco's commitment to victims and the criminal justice system, numerous public safety associations named him "Legislator of the Year". They included Crime Victims United of California, the California Correctional Peace Officers Association, the California Department of Forestry Firefighters Association, the California District Attorney's Association and the California Highway Patrol. On a local level, the Riverside Sheriffs' Association and the Combined Law Enforcement Associations of Riverside County also honored him.

Pacheco's commitment to public service and to victims of crime attracted the attention of significant nonprofit organizations. KidSafe, dedicated to protecting children and named him to their board of directors as an honorary member. In his district, he served as a board member of the University of California, Riverside Friends of Education and the Fender Museum of Music and the Arts.

During his first term in the legislature he served as the Vice-Chairman of the Education Committee and the Select Committee on Education Technology. His efforts resulted in numerous advances for California's schools, most notable was an investment in textbooks and push for stronger school accountability, increased safety measures in schoolyards, and the implementation of statewide testing standards.

As an Assemblyman, the California School Boards Association and the University of California Alumni Association recognized his commitment to education at all levels when both groups named Rod Pacheco their "Legislator of the Year."

In 2000, Pacheco formed a bipartisan legislative coalition aimed at reforming the Cal Grant system to ensure that all eligible students would be provided the resources they need to attend college. The legislation passed both houses of the State Legislature and was signed into law. John Mockler, then California Secretary of Child Development, hailed its passage as "…the most significant educational reform since the G.I. bill." Pacheco was honored by the California State University Students Association as their "Legislator of the Year" for this achievement.

Return to District Attorney's Office 
In 2002, Pacheco concluded his legislative service and returned to the Riverside County District Attorney's Office as a Chief Deputy District Attorney. In 2003, he was promoted to Assistant District Attorney for the Western Division.

In 2006, Pacheco was elected the Riverside County District Attorney without any opposition. He was sworn in as District Attorney on the steps of Riverside County's Historic Courthouse by California Supreme Court Chief Justice Ronald M. George. Speaking at Pacheco's inauguration were former California Governor Pete Wilson and renowned attorney Tino Garza. Pacheco in his remarks promised that he would continue the tradition set by his predecessor, Grover Trask, of having a highly professional office of attorneys that aggressively prosecute crime. Pacheco also stated that he would concentrate on four important areas as the District Attorney: gangs, crime victim rights, public integrity, and environmental justice.

Pacheco led "Operation Falling Sun" which was the largest gang raid in Riverside County's history. 700 law enforcement officers of numerous agencies went into the community of Desert Hot Springs and made numerous arrests and even demolished a drug house. Because of Pacheco's efforts, the number of gang members in Riverside County fell by 40%.

Since Pacheco was sworn in as District Attorney, Riverside County's violent crime rate decreased by 26% according to the California Department of Justice. Additionally, Riverside County has the second highest conviction rate among mid to large counties in California at 93%. According to the California Department of Justice, Riverside County is rated as the third safest mid-to-large county in California.

Gang Task Force
Pacheco is credited with developing and pushing a plan to create a gang task force designated to cover all of Riverside County. After gathering a coalition of law enforcement officials, Riverside County developed a countywide regional strategy for combating the increased gang activity occurring in Riverside County communities. The Riverside County Gang Task Force (GTF) was created in late 2006 and fully staffed with roughly 70 sworn law enforcement officers from 22 different law enforcement agencies by early 2007. The GTF strategy is to combine resources from local, state and federal law enforcement agencies to create eight (8) separate gang task force units across the county. The strategy involves a three-prong approach involving prevention, intervention and suppression.

Pacheco issued the first ever gang injunction in Riverside County history in August 2007 against the largest Riverside County criminal street gang, East Side Riva. In response, an East Side Riva gang member who was an employee of the Press-Enterprise newspaper threatened to kill Pacheco. The newspaper employee took out a classified advertisement in the Press-Enterprise newspaper with the threat, and Pacheco's personal address and cellular phone number, which was obtained through the Pacheco's newspaper subscription records. The employee, Chandler W. Cardwell, was prosecuted by the California Attorney General and convicted of threatening a public official.

Pacheco announced a second gang injunction against the Barrio Dream Homes criminal street gang in Cathedral City, CA on June 12, 2008.

The third and fourth gang injunctions were announced in accordance with Operation Falling Sun on March 27, 2009 in the city of Desert Hot Springs against the True Crime Boys and West Drive Locos criminal street gangs.

Beginning in December 2009, there were numerous attempts to kill gang task force law enforcement officers in the city of Hemet. On July 7, 2010, Pacheco announced the filing of charges against two men involved in those attacks. Nicholas John Smit, 39, was charged with nine counts while co-conspirator Steven William Hansen, 36, was charged with three counts involving attempted murder of a peace officer.

Sex predators
Pacheco is credited with coming up with the idea for the Riverside County Sexual Assault Felony Enforcement (SAFE) task force. The team was created in November 2006. When the team was created, it was estimated that 25% of all registered sex offenders were out of compliance with the terms of their registration under California penal code 290. As of May 2010, the non-compliance rate for sex offenders was at 3%.

The Riverside County SAFE Task Force is a multi-agency Task Force that uses the combined expertise and resources of various law enforcement agencies to create five regional teams throughout Riverside County. The five regional teams are the Indio Region, Corona Region, Cabazon Region, Temecula Region, and Riverside and Moreno Valley Region.

The mission of the Sexual Assault Felony Enforcement (SAFE) Task Force, through the collaborative effort of multi-disciplined Riverside County law enforcement agencies, is to increase public awareness of sexual predators and significantly decrease sexually motivated crimes in the County of Riverside through monitoring, investigating, and prosecuting sex registrants pursuant to California Penal Code Section 290.

Public integrity

On June 16, 2008, Pacheco along with the Attorney General obtained an indictment on four people on a combined 11 felony and 26 misdemeanor counts for their roles in a money-laundering conspiracy involving six different political campaigns for state office. The defendants were Mark Leggio, Nicola Cacucciolo, Nick Vito Cacucciolo and James Lloyd Deremiah. The charges stemmed from illegal monetary contributions made by the defendants to at least six different political campaigns for state office. The timing and pattern of these contributions demonstrated that defendant Leggio had reimbursed employees and friends for making those political contributions.

Environmental crimes
On May 3, 2010, Pacheco, along with then Attorney General Jerry Brown and 18 other California District Attorneys announced they had reached a $27.6 million settlement with Walmart Stores Inc. for various violations of environmental laws and regulations.

As part of the settlement, Walmart instituted policies and procedures throughout their company in California to assure that environmental law and regulations are followed. There were 22 Walmart stores in Riverside County in violation of environmental regulations.

On July 10, 2008, Pacheco filed legal action seeking an injunction against TravelCenters of America for violating the laws governing the management and handling of underground storage tanks of hazardous materials.

At the request of Pacheco, Attorney General Brown joined the case to enforce California's health and safety laws, which Travel centers had consistently violated and ignored.

Over a number of years, the Riverside Department of Environmental Health conducted inspections at the TravelCenters facility in Riverside County, which revealed numerous, longstanding violations of California's underground storage tank law. TravelCenters of America had failed to correct many of the deficiencies, even after repeated warnings.

Operation Falling Sun
Pacheco launched an 8-month investigation that resulted in 700 police officers from 35 different law enforcement agencies conducting the largest gang suppression operation in the history of Riverside County on March 27, 2009. The operation was conducted in conjunction with the service of two gang injunction lawsuits against two of the most violent Desert Hot Springs criminal street gangs.

Pacheco's operation resulted in the arrest of 126 known gang members and other violent criminals, the removal of 50 firearms from the streets, and the seizure of drugs.

Pacheco told The Desert Sun regarding the Operation Falling Sun: "I want the gangs to feel like the sun has fallen on them."

Three months after Operation Falling Sun, Pacheco announced along with Thomas P. O'Brien "Operation Falling Sun Phase II." During an 11-month investigation, the preeminent drug distributors in Desert Hot Springs were uncovered and arrested and charged with federal drug charges.

The investigation uncovered the details of the drug dealers' connection to the Mexican drug cartels. DEA Investigators, FBI agents, an ICE agent, and an IRS investigator have developed cases against the major distributors and followed the trail of ill-gained drug money.

Early release
In August 2007, Pacheco gathered support from 19 other elected District Attorneys in California and filed a motion in federal court seeking to prevent the early release of 56,000 criminals from California State Prisons on behalf of the citizens of Riverside County. Pacheco dedicated Riverside County Assistant District Attorney Bill Mitchell to be lead counsel in the lawsuit to represent himself and the elected District Attorneys from San Diego, Santa Barbara, Orange, Sacramento, San Bernardino, Placer, Colusa, Amador, Contra Costa, Solano, Tehama, Butte, Kern, San Luis Obispo, Ventura, El Dorado, Nevada, Kings and Tuolumne Counties.

In the motion, the 20 District Attorneys have intervened in a federal lawsuit filed against Governor Arnold Schwarzenegger and the State of California by two California prison inmates, Ralph Coleman and Marciano Plata. The Coleman/Plata lawsuit asks the state to address the prison overcrowding issue. The 20 District Attorneys filed the motion in opposition to the Coleman/Plata lawsuit after the United States District Court for the Eastern and Northern District of California appointed a three judge panel to recommend solutions to the overcrowding issues which included implementing a prison population cap and ordering the early release of prisoners.

On December 12, 2008, Pacheco testified in the lawsuit against the early release of prisoners in the San Francisco federal court. In his testimony, Pacheco offered evidence that the early release of prisoners would jeopardize public safety and further harm our fragile local criminal justice system. United States Code section 3626 requires the court to give substantial weight to any adverse effect on public safety or the operation of the criminal justice system caused by the early release of state prisoners.

Judicial response
On October 25, 2010, the Supreme Court of California directly repudiated some of Pacheco's more controversial positions in a unanimous decision signed by Chief Justice Ronald M. George. In the court's words: "Notwithstanding the considerable preference that the Riverside Superior Court generally afforded the trial of criminal cases over civil cases, the District Attorney of Riverside County consistently has taken the position that a California statutory provision required the Riverside court to extend its efforts even further and make every superior court judge and courtroom – including the specialized superior court departments devoted to hearing and resolving family law, probate, and juvenile matters (as well as the judges from outside the county who had been assigned to that court specifically to assist with the backlog of long-delayed civil trials) – potentially available for the trial of any criminal case that was facing dismissal under the applicable California speedy-trial statutes." The court held that Pacheco's position was meritless. The court then also held that the failure of the state legislature to provide enough judges to Riverside County constituted good cause for dismissing severely delayed criminal cases under the relevant state statute implementing the constitutional right to a speedy trial.

Private law practice 
Pacheco was defeated on June 8, 2010, in his bid for reelection as District Attorney by Riverside County Superior Court Judge Paul Zellerbach. After the election, Pacheco said in a statement to the Press Enterprise, "It has been my honor to serve the citizens of Riverside County in a variety of capacities for many years. I look forward to my entrance into private life."

According to the Daily Journal, Pacheco was honored for "standing by his convictions even if it meant ruffling the feathers of the local legal community. He received heat from judges who said his tough stance against most pre-trial plea-bargaining pushed too many cases onto the court's packed calendar. Pacheco refused to bend, vowing not to 'surrender justice' to expediency or cave 'in the face of criticism.'" He quickly became a defense attorney and began defending individuals accused of crime.

On September 18, 2007, Pacheco was named one of California's Top 100 Lawyers by the Los Angeles and San Francisco Daily Journals. It was The Daily Journal Corporation's tenth anniversary honoring California's most influential lawyers. During his legal career, Pacheco has tried well over 100 cases to verdict and has not lost a trial since 1986, shortly after he became an attorney in 1983.

After Pacheco left the Riverside County District Attorneys Office and went into private practice and was awarded the highest rating for lawyers: AV Preeminent by Martindale-Hubbell, an independent lawyer evaluation organization. Pacheco has also been selected as a California Super Lawyer for every year since he has been in private practice. Pacheco's current practice areas include: fraud and enforcement issues, commercial and public law litigation, internal investigations, and white collar defense at Theodora Oringher, which he joined in November 2014.

References

 https://www.nytimes.com/2007/09/04/us/04brfs-APROSECUTORI_BRF.html?_r=1
 http://www.riversidecountygtf.org/index.asp
 http://www.rivcoda.org/News/PressReleases/061208.html
 http://www.rivcoda.org/newsrelease/05.12.10%20NEWS%20RELEASE%20-%20SAFE%20team%20achieves%20lowest%20non-compliance%20rate%20for%20sex%20offenders%20in%20county%20history.pdf

External links
Join California Rod Pacheco

1958 births
Living people
District attorneys in California
Government in Riverside County, California
Hispanic and Latino American state legislators in California
Republican Party members of the California State Assembly
Politicians from Los Angeles
University of California, Riverside alumni
University of San Diego School of Law alumni
21st-century American politicians